The 2021 Sport Clips Haircuts VFW 200 was the 24th stock car race of the 2021 NASCAR Xfinity Series and the 29th iteration of the event. The race was held on September 4, 2021 in Darlington, South Carolina at Darlington Raceway, a  permanent egg-shaped oval racetrack. The race was extended from its scheduled 147 laps to 152 due to a NASCAR overtime finish. Noah Gragson would be able to hold off the field on the final restart and win the race, his first of the year, fourth of his career, and breaking a 49-race winless streak. Harrison Burton of Joe Gibbs Racing and Austin Cindric of Team Penske would fill out the podium, finishing 2nd and 3rd respectively.

Background 

Darlington Raceway is a race track built for NASCAR racing located near Darlington, South Carolina. It is nicknamed "The Lady in Black" and "The Track Too Tough to Tame" by many NASCAR fans and drivers and advertised as "A NASCAR Tradition." It is of a unique, somewhat egg-shaped design, an oval with the ends of very different configurations, a condition which supposedly arose from the proximity of one end of the track to a minnow pond the owner refused to relocate. This situation makes it very challenging for the crews to set up their cars' handling in a way that is effective at both ends.

Entry list

Starting lineup 
Qualifying was determined by a qualifying metric system based on the previous race, the 2021 Wawa 250 and owner's points. As a result, Daniel Hemric of Joe Gibbs Racing would win the pole.

Race

Pre-race ceremonies

Race

Post-race driver comments

Race results 
Stage 1 Laps: 45

Stage 2 Laps: 45

Stage 3 Laps: 62

References 

2021 NASCAR Xfinity Series
NASCAR races at Darlington Raceway
Sport Clips Haircuts VFW 200
Sport Clips Haircuts VFW 200